Ursa Minor (little bear)  is a constellation of stars.

Ursa Minor may also refer to:

 Ursa Minor (cave), a cave in Sequoia National Park, discovered in August 2006
 Ursa Minor (Third Eye Blind album)
 Ursa Minor (Nana Grizol album), 2017